Jalalia may refer to:

 Jalalia, Attock, a village in Punjab, Pakistan
 Jalalia, Khyber Pakhtunkhwa, a village in Khyber Pakhtunkhwa, Pakistan
 Jalalia (leafhopper), a leafhopper genus in the tribe Erythroneurini